Eduardo "Chato" González Ruiz (born 3 January 1944) is a Spanish retired footballer who played as a midfielder, and a current manager.

Playing career
Born in Madrid, González joined Real Madrid's youth setup in 1961. After making his professional debut while on loan at neighbours Rayo Vallecano in Segunda División, he was promoted to the first team in 1966.

González made his La Liga debut on 18 September 1966, in a 1–0 away win against Pontevedra CF. However, he only appeared rarely for the Blancos, and was a part of the squad which won three league titles in a row.

In January 1969 González was loaned to Real Murcia in the second level. The loan was renewed for one year in the summer, and he was an undisputed starter for the side which suffered relegation.

González subsequently returned to Real Madrid, making no appearances during the campaign. In 1971, he moved to Xerez CD in the second tier, and retired with the club in 1973.

Managerial career
In 1978 González was appointed manager of Rayo Vallecano in the top level. Replaced by Héctor Núñez in the following year, he was again named at the helm of the main squad in 1980, with the side now in the second tier.

González would subsequently manage RSD Alcalá, Real Ávila CF, CP Cacereño, Real Murcia (three spells), Getafe CF and Córdoba CF.

Honours
Real Madrid
 3 La Liga: 1966–67, 1967–68, 1968–69

References

External links

1944 births
Living people
Footballers from Madrid
Spanish footballers
Association football midfielders
La Liga players
Segunda División players
Tercera División players
Real Madrid CF players
Rayo Vallecano players
Real Murcia players
Xerez CD footballers
Spain amateur international footballers
Spanish football managers
Rayo Vallecano managers
CP Cacereño managers
Real Murcia managers
Getafe CF managers
Córdoba CF managers
RSD Alcalá managers